Zarrin Deh (also Romanized as Zarrīn Deh; also known as Kesht va Sanʿat Jāvīd) is a village in Akhtarabad Rural District, in the Central District of Malard County, Tehran Province, Iran. At the 2006 census, its population was 74, in 15 families.

References 

Populated places in Malard County